Tasuj-e Olya (also Romanized as Ţasūj-e ‘Olyā; also known as Ţasūj) is a village in Charam Rural District, in the Central District of Charam County, Kohgiluyeh and Boyer-Ahmad Province, Iran. At the 2006 census, its population was 51, in 8 families.

References 

Populated places in Charam County